Gauche may refer to:
 Literal left-hand-referenced relative direction:
 A style of Western fencing using the main-gauche, i.e. the parrying dagger, normally held in the left hand
 Rive Gauche, on the southern (i.e., left, when facing down the direction of flow) bank of the Seine in Paris, France
 Stereochemistry:
 Gauche conformation, a torsion angle of ±60° in alkane stereochemistry
 Gauche effect, a characterization in which the gauche rotamer is more stable than the anti rotamer
 Gauche (Scheme implementation), an implementation of the Scheme programming language

 "Gauche the Cellist",  short story by  Kenji Miyazawa about the eponymous hypothetical cellist

See also 
 Left (disambiguation)